Man on Horseback is a 1634 painting painted by Gerard ter Borch. It shows a man on horseback slumped in the saddle, moving away from the viewer. It is in the collection of the Museum of Fine Arts, Boston.

Description
This painting came into the collection by a 1961 purchase. It had been sold from the estate of Martha Dana Mercer.

Other versions by the artist from the same period are:

References

External links
Man on Horseback Seen From Behind in the RKD

1634 paintings
Paintings by Gerard ter Borch
Paintings in the collection of the Museum of Fine Arts, Boston
Horses in art